Wissam is a given name. People with the name include:

Wissam Ben Bahri, paralympic athlete from Tunisia competing mainly in category F20 long jumpand high jump events
Wissam Barakah (born 1975), Founder of House of  Om, Energy Healing, Hypnosis & Life Coaching, Tantra, Yoga & Meditation Teacher
Wissam El Bekri (born 1984), French-Tunisian football defender
Wissam Constantin, the first deaf person to graduate from a university in Lebanon and the Middle East
Wissam Gassid (born 1981), Iraqi goalkeeper
Wissam Hosni, Tunisian long-distance runner
Wissam Joubran (born 1983), composer, oud (an Arabic lute) virtuoso, and master lute maker
Wissam Kadhim (born 1986), Iraqi football (soccer) midfielder
Wissam Kilo, (born 1984), known as Wiz Kilo, Canadian hip hop and R&B artist, songwriter, dancer, actor and hip hop instructor
Wissam S. al-Hashimi, Iraqi geologist born in Baghdad
Wissam Tarif (born 1975), played a key role in the field of pro-Democracy and Human Rights work in Syria and Lebanon
Wissam al-Hassan (1965–2012), brigadier general at the Lebanese Internal Security Forces, head of its intelligence-oriented information branch
Wissam al-Zahawie, former official in Saddam Hussein Iraq government, Iraq's non-resident Ambassador to the Holy See, Iraq's Ambassador to the United Nations
Wissam Ben Yedder (born 1990), French footballer
Wissam Zaki (born 1986), Duhok FC player and Iraq

See also
Al Wissam, designer clothing brand based in Dearborn, Michigan, founded by Bassem Souwaidam, who is known for his art of embroidery
Assassination of Wissam al-Hassan, October 2012 Beirut bombing
Wissam al-Arch or Order of the Throne (Arabic: Wissam al-Arch, French: Ordre du Trône), a state decoration of the Kingdom of Morocco
Wissam al-Mohammadi or Order of Muhammad, also named Order of Sovereignty, the highest state decoration of the Kingdom of Morocco
ISAM
WISA
WSSM (disambiguation)